Somatoparaphrenia is a type of monothematic delusion where one denies ownership of a limb or an entire side of one's body. Even if provided with undeniable proof that the limb belongs to and is attached to their own body, the patient produces elaborate confabulations about whose limb it really is or how the limb ended up on their body. In some cases, delusions become so elaborate that a limb may be treated and cared for as if it were a separate being.

Somatoparaphrenia differs from a similar disorder, asomatognosia, which is characterized as loss of recognition of half of the body or a limb, possibly due to paralysis or unilateral neglect. For example, asomatognosic patients may mistake their arm for the doctor's. However, they can be shown their limb and this error is temporarily corrected.

Somatoparaphrenia has been reported to occur predominantly  in the left arm of one's body, and it is often accompanied by left-sided paralysis and anosognosia (denial or lack of awareness) of the paralysis. The link between somatoparaphrenia and paralysis has been documented in many clinical cases, and while the question arises as to whether paralysis is necessary for somatoparaphrenia to occur, anosognosia is not, as documented by cases with somatoparaphrenia and paralysis with no anosognosia.

Causes

It has been suggested that damage to the posterior cerebral regions (temporoparietal junction) of the cortex may play a significant role in the development of somatoparaphrenia. However, more recent studies have shown that damage to deep cortical regions such as the posterior insula and subcortical structures such as the basal ganglia, the thalamus and the white matter connecting the thalamus to the cortex may also play a significant role in the development of somatoparaphrenia. It has also been suggested that involvement of deep cortical and subcortical grey structures of the temporal lobe may contribute to reduce the sense of familiarity experienced by somatoparaphrenic patients for their paralyzed limb.

Diagnosis

Treatment
One form of treatment that has produced a more integrated body awareness is mirror therapy, in which the individual who denies that the affected limb belongs to their body looks into a mirror at the limb. Patients looking into the mirror state that the limb does belong to them; however body ownership of the limb does not remain after the mirror is taken away.

See also
Allochiria
Body integrity dysphoria
Body schema
Cotard delusion
Phantom limb

References

Delusional disorders
Psychosis
Delusions